The 1995 edition of the Copa Libertadores saw Grêmio of Brazil as the champions after they defeated Atlético Nacional of Colombia in the finals.

Group stage
Velez Sársfield gets a bye to second round as current champions.

Group 1

Group 2

Group 3

Group 4

Group 5

Knockout stages

Bracket

Round of 16
First leg matches were played between April 25, 1995, and April 27, 1995. Second leg matches were played on May 3, 1995, and May 4, 1995.

Quarter-finals

First leg matches were played on July 21, 1995, and July 26, 1995. Second leg matches were played on August 2, 1995.

Semi-finals

First leg matches were played on August 9, 1995. Second leg matches were played on August 16, 1995.

Finals

First leg

Second leg

Champion

External links
Copa Libertadores 1995 by Juan Pablo Andrés and Frank Ballesteros at RSSSF

1
Copa Libertadores seasons